Choijinzhab (also known as Choijinjab or Qôijûngjabû; 16 January 1931 – 29 April 2022) was a Chinese linguist of Mongolian ethnicity.

Biography
Choijinzhab was born in Jirim League (哲里木盟), Inner Mongolia in 1931. After graduating from the Ulaan Bator Normal College in Mongolia in 1949 he taught at a primary school in Ulaan Bator, before returning to Inner Mongolia in 1950. He initially worked as an editor at the Inner Mongolia People's Publishing House, and then studied as a research student at the Central College for Nationalities from 1954 to 1957. After graduating he took up a post at the Inner Mongolia University, where he remained through his career. He was a professor at the university's Institute of Mongolian Studies. He was also the honorary director of the Chinese Academy of Mongolian Language and the director of the Chinese Academy of Ethnic Languages.

Between 1983 and 2022 Choijinzhab was involved with the computerization of Mongolian, and the creation of software for writing and editing Mongolian. He also worked on the standardization of the Mongolian script, both within China and internationally, and in 1998-1999 was intimately involved in the encoding of Mongolian in the Universal Character Set and Unicode. He was also involved in the encoding of the Phags-pa script in 2003-2004.

Works
1985. Lao Mengwen Tuo Mengwen Duizhao Mengyu Cidian 老蒙文托蒙文对照蒙语词典 (Dictionary of Mongolian with Old Mongolian and Todo Mongolian). Hohhot.
1987. Weilate Fangyan Huayu Cailiao 卫拉特方言话语材料 (Materials on the Oirat Dialect). Hohhot.
1989. Mengguyu Yufa Yanjiu 蒙古语语法研究 (Study of Mongolian Grammar). Hohhot. 
1991. Hanyi Meng Jichu Zhishi 汉译蒙基础知识 (Chinese Translation of Mongolian Basic Knowledge). Hohhot.
1998. Weilate Fangyan Cihui 卫拉特方言词汇 (Vocabulary of the Oirat Dialect). Hohhot.
1999. Mengguyu Yuyin Shengxue Fenxi 蒙古语语音声学分析 (Analysis of the Mongolian Phonetics). Hohhot.
2000. Mengguwen Bianma 蒙古文编码 (Mongolian Encoding). Hohhot. 
Hitoshi Kuribayashi and Choijinzhab, 2001. Gencho hishi Mongorugo zentango gobi sakuin (Word- and suffix-index to The Secret history of the Mongols). Sendai.

References

External links

 Article about Choijinzhab on the Hudong wiki
 Article celebrating Choijinzhab's fifty years as a teacher
 Biography of Choijinzhab

1931 births
2022 deaths
'Phags-pa script scholars
Linguists from China
Mongolists
People involved with Unicode
Articles containing Mongolian script text
Minzu University of China alumni
People from Tongliao
Educators from Inner Mongolia
Writers from Inner Mongolia